Kilmore Quay is a fishing village near Kilmore, in County Wexford, Ireland. As of 2016, it has a population of 372. It is a fishing village, but its leisure facilities such as sailing, and sea angling charters are also of economic importance.

Tourism
The village holds a seafood festival during the summer with seafood served every day, live music, and activities such as races and family events.

Architecturally notable buildings in the village include St Peter's Church, which was built in 1875 to a design attributed to architect George Ashlin.

Ballyteige Castle, a 15th-century tower house which was the ancestral home of the Anglo-Irish Whitty family, who lived there until the 1650s, is approximately 1 mile north of Kilmore Quay.

The Saltee Islands lie off the coast near Kilmore Quay, and boat trips to these islands are available from the village. The two islands, Great Saltee and Little Saltee, are known for being Ireland's largest bird sanctuary with gannets, gulls, puffins, cormorants, razorbills, and guillemots living on the islands.

Public transport
Wexford Bus operates several services a day (not Sundays) between Wexford and Kilmore Quay via Johnstown Castle and Bridgetown. Bus Éireann route 383 operates between Wexford railway station and Kilmore Quay on Wednesdays and Saturdays only.

Marina
There is a boating marina located in the harbour. This serves as a jumping-off point for many Irish yachts embarking on journeys to France and beyond. It is also the first landing point for many visitors from Britain and continental Europe.

Kilmore Harbour is also home to the launching point for an RNLI lifeboat.

Gallery

See also
 List of towns and villages in Ireland
 List of RNLI stations

References

Towns and villages in County Wexford